Moires ("Fates") is a town and a former municipality in the Heraklion regional unit, Crete, Greece. Since the 2011 local government reform it is part of the municipality Faistos, of which it is a municipal unit. The weekly market of the agricultural town of Moires is the largest in the region. In the early Middle Ages it was the home of Christian hermits, who allegedly met only once a year to worship at the chapel of Agios Andonis, built in the 14th or 15th century.

Subdivisions

The municipal unit of Moires is divided into the following communities:

 Moires
 Alithini
 Antiskari
 Galia
 Kastelli
 Kouses
 Peri
 Petrokefali
 Pigaidakia (including Kaloi Limenes)
 Pompia
 Roufas
 Skourvoula

Population

Climate

Moires has a mild climate throughout the year with mild winters and hot summers. The climate is generally dry with an average annual precipitation of 445 mm. According to the National Observatory of Athens maximum temperatures in the winter remain over 16 °C while in the summer they are close to 35 °C.

References

Messara Plain
Populated places in Heraklion (regional unit)